John Shaw (29 November 1912 – 13 June 2000) was a Scottish professional footballer who played as a defender, most famous for his time at Rangers, where he was captain between 1938 and 1950.

Career
Rangers signed Shaw, known as 'Tiger' for his tough, physical style of play, from Airdrieonians for £2,000 in July 1938. He went on make over 600 appearances for the Ibrox club, winning four Scottish league championships, three Scottish Cups and two League Cups. Shaw holds the distinction of being the captain of the first Scottish club to lift "the treble" of League, League Cup and Scottish Cup.  After retirement in 1953 he remained associated with the club as third-team trainer and later groundsman.

Shaw was capped six times by Scotland. His brother Davie was also a Scottish international, who played for Hibernian and Aberdeen.

Later life
Shaw lived for the majority of his life close to his Annathill birthplace, in the larger village of Glenboig; he died there on 13 June 2000.

See also
List of Scotland national football team captains
List of Scotland wartime international footballers
List of Scottish football families

References

External links

Hall of Fame profile at Rangers.co.uk

1912 births
2000 deaths
Scottish footballers
Airdrieonians F.C. (1878) players
Rangers F.C. players
Benburb F.C. players
Scotland international footballers
Scotland wartime international footballers
Association football defenders
Rangers F.C. non-playing staff
Scottish Football League players
Scottish Junior Football Association players
Footballers from North Lanarkshire
Scottish Football League representative players